Eddy Casteels (born 19 August 1960) is a Belgian professional basketball coach and former player. He is currently the head coach for the Leuven Bears of the Pro Basketball League. From 2005 till 2018 he was the head coach of the Belgium national basketball team

He is also the author of the book Zo De Coach, Zo Het Team.

Career
Casteels has coached several Belgian teams over a long period, as well as one team in the Netherlands in ZZ Leiden. He was named Coach of the Year of the Belgian League three times, as he won the award in 2000, 2002 and 2009.

Casteels' first job as head coach was with the newly merged Racing Basket Antwerpen project. He won the Belgian league with his team in 1999-2000. In the 2000–01 season, Casteels coached Ieper. The Belgian club Athlon Ieper closed down after this season due to financial difficulties. Casteels became winner of the Belgian league with BC Oostende in his first year as head coach of the club. He also won the Belgian Cup in 2002 with Oostende. In 2004 he participated in the FIBA Europe League with his team. In 2004, Casteels became the head coach of Verviers-Pepinster. During his period as head coach of RBC Verviers-Pepinster, Casteels coached his team in the FIBA Europe League in 2005. With the club Spirou Charleroi, Casteels coached in the 2007 EuroCup. In 2008, Casteels signed with the Antwerp Giants. Casteels coached the Antwerp Giants for 4 seasons in a row to the EuroChallenge. On 30 May 2014, Casteels signed a 2-year contract with Dutch team ZZ Leiden of the Dutch Basketball League (DBL).

On 8 January 2018, Casteels signed with Leuven Bears.

Belgian national team
Casteels qualified the Belgian Lions towards to four consecutive participations of EuroBasket in 2011, 2013, 2015. and 2017.

Honours
Belgian Championship: 2000, 2002, 2008
Belgian Cup: 2000
Individual awards:
BLB Coach of the Year: 2000, 2002, 2009

References

External links
FIBA Profile

1960 births
Living people
Antwerp Giants coaches
BC Oostende coaches
Belgian basketball coaches
RBC Verviers-Pepinster coaches
Spirou Charleroi coaches
Leuven Bears coaches
Zorg en Zekerheid Leiden coaches
Basketball coaches of international teams
Sportspeople from Mechelen
Belgian expatriate basketball people in the Netherlands